The Commons members of the Parliamentary Labour Party (PLP) elected 19 members of the Shadow Cabinet from among their number in 2010. This follows the Labour Party's defeat at the 2010 general election, after which the party formed the Official Opposition in the United Kingdom.

A separate election for Opposition Chief Whip, an ex officio member of the Shadow Cabinet, happened at the same time. Rosie Winterton was unopposed in that election, and she would serve for the remainder of the Parliament. The results of the Shadow Cabinet election were announced on 7 October 2010, hours after the balloting closed.

The PLP voted to abolish Shadow Cabinet elections at a meeting on 5 July 2011, and the National Executive Committee and the Party Conference followed suit. As a result, the 2010 Shadow Cabinet election was the last.

Background
Shadow Cabinet elections typically happened near the beginning of a session, but were delayed until after the leadership election, which ended with the announcement of Ed Miliband as winner on 25 September. Nominations were open from 26 to 29 September, and voting occurred from 4 to 7 October. The leader may choose to assign Shadow Cabinet portfolios to non-members, who are considered to "attend" Shadow Cabinet.

Rule changes
On 8 September 2010, the PLP voted to continue electing the Shadow Cabinet and made various changes to the rules for such elections:
 Shadow Cabinet elections will be held every two years, rather than every year.
 The Chief Whip will once again be separately elected, reversing a change made before the 1995 Shadow Cabinet election that allowed the Leader of the Labour Party to hand out the position as with any other Shadow Cabinet portfolio. Now, the Chief Whip will be elected by the PLP for the duration of a Parliament.
 For a PLP member's ballot to be valid, it must contain votes for at least six women and six men, up from four.
 The Shadow Cabinet will no longer be the Parliamentary Committee when the party is in opposition. Instead, the latter will be a backbench group just as when the party is in government.

Ex officio members
The following are also members of the Shadow Cabinet by virtue of the office listed:
 Leader of the Labour Party (Ed Miliband)
 Deputy Leader (Harriet Harman)
 Opposition Chief Whip in the Commons (Rosie Winterton)
 Leader of the Opposition in the House of Lords (Baroness Royall of Blaisdon)
 Opposition Chief Whip in the Lords (Lord Bassam of Brighton)

Candidates
Shortly after the 2010 general election, Shadow Chancellor of the Exchequer Alistair Darling announced that he would not be a candidate in the elections, thus ending more than 20 years of frontbench service. In August, both Shadow Justice Secretary Jack Straw and Shadow Defence Secretary Bob Ainsworth announced their retirements from the frontbench. On 29 September, the day nominations closed, Shadow Foreign Secretary David Miliband announced he would step down from the Shadow Cabinet, having been defeated for the Labour leadership days earlier by his brother, Ed.

Forty-nine Labour MPs stood for election, and the results were as follows:

Notes
† Multiple candidates tied for position.

Chief Whip election
At the same time they elect members of the Shadow Cabinet, the Commons PLP will elect the Opposition Chief Whip. The incumbent Chief Whip, Nick Brown, announced on 29 September that he would not be a candidate, writing in a letter to the new leader, Ed Miliband, that though he had intended to stand for election to the post, he was acceding to Miliband's request that he stand down. According to the BBC, after the announcement, Jim Fitzpatrick, who had also intended to stand for the post, withdrew his candidacy, and Miliband asked Rosie Winterton to stand, and she did so unopposed.

References

2010
Labour Party Shadow Cabinet
Lab